Elm Creek is a stream in the U.S. state of Wisconsin.

Elm Creek was so named on account of elm timber along its course.

References

Rivers of Wood County, Wisconsin
Rivers of Wisconsin